John Powell (1645–1713), of Gloucester, was an English politician and lawyer.

He was elected as Member (MP) of the Parliament of England for Gloucester in 1685.

Legal career
He was appointed as a Baron of the Exchequer in 1691, and transferred  to Common Pleas in 1695 and then to Queen's Bench in 1702. He was the judge at one of England's last witchcraft trials, that of Jane Wenham in 1712.

He has a memorial in Gloucester Cathedral sculpted by Thomas Green of Camberwell.

References

External links

1645 births
1713 deaths
People from Gloucester
Members of the Parliament of England (pre-1707) for Gloucester
English MPs 1685–1687
Barons of the Exchequer
Justices of the Common Pleas
Justices of the King's Bench